Machraa El Ain is a small town and rural commune in Taroudant Province of the Souss-Massa-Drâa region of Morocco. At the time of the 2004 census, the commune had a total population of 9832 people living within 1756 households. The administrative headquarter of the Commune is in Ain el Madiour.

References

Populated places in Taroudannt Province
Rural communes of Souss-Massa